Jerry's Subs & Pizza is an American fast casual sandwich and pizza restaurant chain based in Maryland. It currently has 6 open locations.

History
Jerry's was founded in 1954 outside Washington, D.C. and was incorporated to its current position in Wheaton, Maryland in 1964. Jerry's is headquartered in Gaithersburg, Maryland.

Jerry's opened its first sports bar concept in Hagerstown, MD in April 2017 but that location closed on July 3, 2019.

Recognition
Jerry's was recognized as Maryland's #1 Most Iconic Brand by Thrillist, Top 100 Pizza Company in 2013-18 by Pizza Today Magazine, and Largest Locally Owned Restaurant Chain and Top Restaurant Chain in 2013-15 by the Washington Business Journal.

See also
 List of pizza chains of the United States

References

External links
jerrysusa.com

1954 establishments in Maryland
1964 establishments in Maryland
Companies based in Gaithersburg, Maryland
Fast-food franchises
Fast-food chains of the United States
Pizza chains of the United States
Regional restaurant chains in the United States
Restaurants established in 1964
Restaurants in Washington, D.C.
Submarine sandwich restaurants
Privately held companies based in Maryland
Wheaton, Maryland